Rhinacloa is a genus of plant bugs in the family Miridae. There are more than 30 described species in Rhinacloa.

Species
These 39 species belong to the genus Rhinacloa:

 Rhinacloa antennalis (Reuter, 1905)
 Rhinacloa apicalis (Reuter, 1905)
 Rhinacloa aricana Carvalho, 1948
 Rhinacloa azapa Schuh & Schwartz, 1985
 Rhinacloa basalis (Reuter, 1907)
 Rhinacloa bellissima Carvalho & Gomes, 1970
 Rhinacloa betanzos Schuh & Schwartz, 1985
 Rhinacloa cajamarca Schuh & Schwartz, 1985
 Rhinacloa callicrates Herring, 1971
 Rhinacloa cardini (Barber & Bruner, 1946)
 Rhinacloa carvalhoi Schuh & Schwartz, 1985
 Rhinacloa chapini Schuh & Schwartz, 1985
 Rhinacloa clara (Carvalho, 1991)
 Rhinacloa clavicornis (Reuter, 1905)
 Rhinacloa crassitoma Carvalho, 1984
 Rhinacloa dimorphica Carvalho & Carpintero, 1990
 Rhinacloa fernandoana Schuh & Schwartz, 1985
 Rhinacloa forticornis Reuter, 1876 (western plant bug)
 Rhinacloa incaicus (Carvalho & Gomes, 1968)
 Rhinacloa insularis (Barber, 1925)
 Rhinacloa jujuyensis Carvalho & Carpintero, 1990
 Rhinacloa juli Schuh & Schwartz, 1985
 Rhinacloa longirostris (Carvalho, 1968)
 Rhinacloa luridipennis (Reuter, 1908)
 Rhinacloa maiuscula Carvalho, 1948
 Rhinacloa manleyi Schuh & Schwartz, 1985
 Rhinacloa mella (Van Duzee, 1937)
 Rhinacloa mesoamericana Schuh & Schwartz, 1985
 Rhinacloa mysteriosus Schuh & Schwartz, 1985
 Rhinacloa nigripes Maldonado, 1969
 Rhinacloa pallidipennis Schuh & Schwartz, 1985
 Rhinacloa pallidipes Maldonado, 1969
 Rhinacloa penai Schuh & Schwartz, 1985
 Rhinacloa peruana Schuh & Schwartz, 1985
 Rhinacloa puertoricensis Schuh & Schwartz, 1985
 Rhinacloa rubescens Carvalho, 1968
 Rhinacloa rubroornata Schuh & Schwartz, 1985
 Rhinacloa schaffneri Schuh & Schwartz, 1985
 Rhinacloa usingeri (Carvalho, 1968)

References

Further reading

External links

 

Nasocorini
Articles created by Qbugbot